Euura pedunculi is a species of sawfly belonging to the family Tenthredinidae (common sawflies). The larva feed within galls on the leaves of sallows (Salix species). It was first described by Theodor Hartig in 1837.

Description of the gall
The gall is found on the underside of a leaf of the host pant, is globular or ovoid and up to 5 mm. It can be green or yellow, sometimes flushed wth a red, can have warts and varying density of hairs. On the upperside of the leaf is a yellowish scar which can be flush with the surface or very slightly raised.

The gall is found on eared willow (S. aurita), goat willow (S. caprea), the hybrid of goat and tea-leaved willow (S. caprea x phylicifolia), grey willow (S. cinerea), S. silesiaca and S. starkeana.

Distribution
This species is found in most of Europe north to Inari, Finland and east to Sakhalin, Russia. The gall is common in Great Britain and Ireland.

References

External links
 
 Nature Spot

Tenthredinidae
Gall-inducing insects
Hymenoptera of Asia
Hymenoptera of Europe
Insects described in 1837
Taxa named by Theodor Hartig
Willow galls